Kontusz (Polish plural kontusze; , Lithuanian: kontušas; originally from Hungarian köntös- "robe") - a type of outer garment worn by the Hungarian and Polish-Lithuanian male nobility. It became popular in the 16th century and came to the Polish–Lithuanian Commonwealth rule via Hungary from Turkey. In the 17th century, worn over an inner garment (żupan), the kontusz became a notable element of male Polish national and Zaporozhian cossack attire.

The kontusz was a long robe, usually reaching to below the knees, with a set of decorative buttons down the front. The sleeves were long and loose, on hot days worn untied, thrown on the back. In winter a fur lining could be attached to the kontusz, or a delia worn over it. The kontusz was usually of a vivid colour, and the lining was of a contrasting hue. The kontusz was tied with a long, wide sash called a pas kontuszowy.

The kontusz was more of a decorative garment than a useful one. Tradition states that the first kontusze were worn by szlachta who captured them from Ottomans to display as loot.

Throwing kontusz sleeves on one's back and stroking one's moustache was considered to be a signal of readiness for a fight.

In 1776, Sejm deputies from different voivodeships of Poland were obliged to wear different coloured żupany and kontusze denoting their voivodeships.

In Poland, kontusz was worn mainly by the nobility, but it was also adopted by the Zaporozhian cossacks when Ukraine and Ruthenia were under Polish rule.

See also 
 Delia (clothing)
 Pas kontuszowy
 Sukmana
 Żupan

Sources 
 Jan Samek: Polskie Rzemiosło Artystyczne, Wydawnictwa Artystyczne i Filmowe, Warszawa 1984,

External links 

Short description, sketch

Polish clothing
Lithuanian clothing
Lithuanian nobility
Belarusian clothing
Ukrainian folk clothing
Coats (clothing)